J. K. Amalou is a French screenwriter, producer and director, known for his 2012 movie Deviation.

Filmography

References

External links
 

French screenwriters
French film producers
English-language film directors
Living people
Year of birth missing (living people)
Place of birth missing (living people)